North Battersea-Pride's Field Historic District is a national historic district located at Petersburg, Virginia. The district includes 156 contributing buildings and 2 contributing sites (the Battersea Canal and South Canal) located in a predominantly residential section of Petersburg. It includes a varied collection of mid- to late 19th- and early 20th-century middle and working-class houses and includes notable examples of Queen Anne and Gothic Revival style architecture.  Notable buildings include the late-18th century stone toll keeper's house, Montview (c. 1810), Pride's Tavern dependency (c. 1820), and West Street Presbyterian Chapel.

It was listed on the National Register of Historic Places in 2005.

References

Historic districts on the National Register of Historic Places in Virginia
Queen Anne architecture in Virginia
Gothic Revival architecture in Virginia
Buildings and structures in Petersburg, Virginia
National Register of Historic Places in Petersburg, Virginia